The Lost Boy (original title: Fyrvaktaren) is a detective novel by Camilla Läckberg, published in Sweden in 2009. The English version was published in March 2013 by HarperCollins.

Summary
The police inspector, Patrick Hedström, has just started working again after a long time off because of sickness. He has been trying to relax, all the while taking care of his wife, Erica, and their prematurely born twins. He has barely entered the door to the office before he is already thrown into a new investigation. A man has been found murdered in his apartment, with a bullet in his head. 
The victim is Mats Sverin, financial manager of the local council, a very friendly and beloved man. No one has anything bad to say about him. 

With his coworkers, Patrick starts to redraw Mat's life, which contains more secrets than anyone would ever have suspected. Why was he in such a hurry to leave Göteborg to return to his home town Fjällbacka? What role did he play in the project of transforming the ancient hotel into a spa? And is it pure coincidence that Annie Tapis, his childhood girlfriend, has also returned? They have not been in contact for several years, but now she and her son live on the island of Gråskär, near Fjällbacka - a place where her family has been living for generations. Furthermore, Gråskär has its share of secrets and is an area, which has always been surrounded by disastrous rumours. It is said that the island is haunted by the dead and that they have something to say about life...

References

novels by Camilla Läckberg
Novels set in Sweden
2009 Swedish novels
Swedish crime novels
Swedish detective novels
Bokförlaget Forum books
HarperCollins books